Mireia is a Catalan given name. It is a variant of the protagonist of the 1859 poem "Mirèio".

People with the name
 Mireia Belmonte (born 1990), Catalan Olympic swimmer
 Mireia Boya Busquet (born 1979), Catalan scientist and politician
 Mireia Epelde (born 1985), Spanish racing cyclist
 Mireia García (born 1981), Catalan swimmer
 Mireia Gutiérrez (born 1988), Andorran Olympic skier
 Mireia Lalaguna (born 1992), Catalan actress and model
 Mireia Miró Varela (born 1988), Catalan ski mountaineer and long-distance runner
 Mireia Riera Casanovas, Catalan swimmer
 Mireia Vehí (born 1985), Catalan politician

See also
 Mireia (genus), a genus of flower chafer beetles
 Miriam (given name)

References

Catalan feminine given names